Asle Enger (15 August 1906 – 27 January 2000) was a Norwegian priest. He was born in Ådal. Enger volunteered as priest for Norwegian military officers in German prisoner-of-war camps during World War II, from 1943 to 1945. He was decorated Knight, First Class of the Order of St. Olav in 1946. In 1950 he published the book Med feltprestens øyne.

References

1906 births
2000 deaths
People from Ringerike (municipality)
20th-century Norwegian Lutheran clergy
Norwegian people of World War II
Norwegian World War II memoirists
20th-century Norwegian writers